Celia Hawkesworth (born 1942) is an author, lecturer, and translator of Serbo-Croatian.

Biography 
Celia Hawkesworth graduated from Newnham College, Cambridge in 1964 and was awarded a British Council scholarship to study in Belgrade for 10 months, where she began her career as a translator.
From 1971 to 2002, Hawkesworth was a senior lecturer of Serbian and Croatian in the School of Slavonic and East European Studies at the University of London. Based in Kirtlington and an active part of the environmentalist movement, she has translated over 40 books by Slavic authors into English, including The Culture of Lies by Dubravka Ugrešić, My Heart by Semezdin Mehmedinović, EEG by Daša Drndić, and Omer Pasha Latas by Nobel Prize winner Ivo Andrić. She has also written several textbooks of colloquial Croatian, Serbian, Serbo-Croatian, an anthology of Serbian and Bosnian women writers, a cultural history of Zagreb, and a literary biography of Ivo Andrić.

In 1975, she was appointed to as a trustee to the British Trust Scholarship and has served as both secretary and chairperson.

Her translation of Daša Drndić's Canzone di Guerra (Istros Books) and Senka Marić's Body Kintsugi (Peirene Press) were awarded a PEN Translates grant by English PEN.

Selected bibliography

Translator

Accolades 
1998: Weidenfeld Prize for Literary Translation shortlist for The Museum of Unconditional Surrender by Dubravka Ugrešić
1999: Heldt Prize for Culture of Lies by Dubravka Ugrešić
2018: EBRD Literature Prize finalist for Belladonna by Daša Drndić
2018: Warwick Prize for Women in Translation winner for Belladonna by Daša Drndić
2018: Oxford-Weidenfeld Translation Prize shortlist for Belladonna by Daša Drndić
2019: Republic of Consciousness Prize shortlist for Doppelgänger by Daša Drndić
2019: Oxford-Weidenfeld Translation Prize winner for Omer Pasha Latas by Ivo Andrić
2020: American Association of Teachers for Slavic and Eastern European Languages' Best Literary Translation into English for EEG by Daša Drndić
2020: Best Translated Book Award for EEG by Daša Drndić

References

Living people
British translators
Translators to English
Serbian–English translators
Translators from Serbian
20th-century translators
21st-century translators
21st-century British translators
Literary translators
Alumni of Newnham College, Cambridge
1942 births